The Delta Classic 4 Literacy (also known as the Delta Classic) was a college football game held between historically black colleges.  It was held annually in Little Rock, Arkansas from 2006 to 2012.

History
Fitz Hill created the event, then known as the Literacy Classic while serving as head football coach at San Jose State University. After becoming president of Arkansas Baptist College, Hill restarted the event in Little Rock as The Delta Classic 4 Literacy, with the intent of raising awareness regarding illiteracy in the Delta region. Proceeds from the game go to the Arkansas Literacy Council. The first game in the Arkansas version of the Delta Classic was played between Grambling State University and the University of Arkansas-Pine Bluff in October, 2006, with UAPB gaining the victory en route to winning the Southwestern Athletic Conference Western Division title that season.  In the second Delta Classic held on October 13, 2007, Grambling State defeated UAPB 30–24.

The Delta Classic 4 Literacy was discontinued in 2012 with the last game in the series being a 17–14 victory by UAPB over Langston University. UAPB ended with a 3–4 record in the Delta Classic, including two victories against Grambling State in 2006 and 2009.

Game results

See also
 List of black college football classics
 University of Arkansas at Pine Bluff
 UAPB Golden Lions football

References

Sports in Little Rock, Arkansas
Black college football classics